Megatrigon is a genus of hoverflies (family Syrphidae) within the tribe Eumerini.

Species 
M. apiformis Doczkal, Radenković, Lyneborg & Pape, 2016
M. argenteus (Walker, 1852)
M. argentifrons Doczkal, Radenković, Lyneborg & Pape, 2016
M. argentimaculatus Doczkal, Radenković, Lyneborg & Pape, 2016
M. cooksoni Doczkal, Radenković, Lyneborg & Pape, 2016
M. flavimarginatus (Hull, 1964)
M. immaculatus Doczkal, Radenković, Lyneborg & Pape, 2016
M. jacobi (Herve-Bazin, 1913)
M. magnicornis Doczkal, Radenković, Lyneborg & Pape, 2016
M. natalensis Doczkal, Radenković, Lyneborg & Pape, 2016
M. nivalis (Hull, 1964)
M. ochreatus (Hull, 1964)
M. sexfasciatus Johnson, 1898
M. sexmaculatus Doczkal, Radenković, Lyneborg & Pape, 2016
M. tabanoides Doczkal, Radenković, Lyneborg & Pape, 2016

References 

Hoverfly genera
Eumerini
Taxa named by Charles Willison Johnson